Eudonia scoriella is a species of moth in the family Crambidae. It is found on Madeira.

References

Moths described in 1858
Eudonia